Maciste, the Avenger of the Mayans is a 1965 Italian film directed by Guido Malatesta.

Cast
Kirk Morris	... 	Ercole
Barbara Loy	... 	Aloha
Andrea Aureli	... 	Manur
Demeter Bitenc	... 	Gruno
Lucia Bomez
Mimmo Maggio
Rita Klein
Luciana Paoli
Luciano Marin	... 	Donar
Antonio Casale	... 	Berak
Koloss	... 	Goliath
Nando Angelini

Production
Maciste, the Avenger of the Mayans combines footage from two previous films: Fire Monsters Against the Son of Hercules and Colossus and the Headhunters.

Release
Maciste, the Avengers of the Mayans was released as Maciste il vendicatore dei Maya in Italy on 26 May 1965.

See also
 List of Italian films of 1965

References

Bibliography

External links
 
 Maciste, the Avenger of the Mayans at Variety Distribution

1965 films
1960s Italian-language films
Peplum films
Films directed by Guido Malatesta
Maciste films
Sword and sandal films
1960s Italian films